Sweetest Love   is a compilation album by Welsh mezzo-soprano singer Katherine Jenkins. It was released in the United Kingdom on 14 March 2011 as a Digital download and CD. It peaked to number 199 on the UK Albums Chart and number 22 on the Irish Albums Chart.

Track listing

Chart performance

Release history

References

Katherine Jenkins albums
2011 albums